Trachysphaera is a genus of pill millipedes in the order Glomerida. Around 30 species are known, making it the third most species-rich genus of Glomerida. Trachysphaera species are patchily distributed throughout Europe and western Asia, extending from Spain to Caucasia.

Species

 Trachysphaera acutula
 Trachysphaera anatolica
 Trachysphaera apenninorum
 Trachysphaera biharica
 Trachysphaera coiffaiti
 Trachysphaera corcyraea
 Trachysphaera costata
 Trachysphaera cristangula
 Trachysphaera cultrifera
 Trachysphaera dobrogica
 Trachysphaera drescoi
 Trachysphaera fabbrii
 Trachysphaera fragilis
 Trachysphaera gasparoi
 Trachysphaera gibbula
 Trachysphaera jonescui
 Trachysphaera ligurina
 Trachysphaera lobata
 Trachysphaera lobotarsus
 Trachysphaera minuta
 Trachysphaera multiclavigera
 Trachysphaera orghidani
 Trachysphaera orientalis
 Trachysphaera ormeana
 Trachysphaera pygidalis
 Trachysphaera pyrenaica
 Trachysphaera racovitzai
 Trachysphaera radiosa
 Trachysphaera ribauti
 Trachysphaera rousseti
 Trachysphaera schmidti
 Trachysphaera solida
 Trachysphaera spelaea
 Trachysphaera varallensis

References

Glomerida
Millipedes of Europe